Interlaken is a village in Seneca County, New York, United States. The population was 602 at the 2010 census.  The name is related to the village's position between two lakes.

The Village of Interlaken is in the northern part of the Town of Covert and is northwest of Ithaca, New York.

History
First settled in the late 1790s and early 1800s, the Village of Interlaken was home to many families from the New England and New Jersey areas. Early businesses included hotels, blacksmiths, post office, bank, and in time the railroad station. All designed to support the local families and the farmers from the surrounding area.

Four churches were established to serve the community, Union Baptist in 1819, Reformed Church of Farmerville in 1830, a Universalist church in 1850 and St. Francis Solanus Catholic Church in 1874.  The First Baptist Church of Interlaken was listed on the National Register of Historic Places in 2002.

Originally called Farmerville, then Farmer, and Farmer Village the hamlet continued to grow. Prosperous homes were built on Main Street, Lodi Street (now West Avenue), and along the side streets. LeRoy, Lake View, Clinton and Knight Streets were the last to be added.

In 1904 two events occurred in close proximity. With the increase in summer travelers coming to the area on the Lehigh Valley Railroad there was a movement to rename the railroad depot something more than Farmer. The Railroad sponsored a contest to suggest names for the station and a school teacher, Miss Georgiana Wheeler, suggested the name of Interlaken based on her travels to Switzerland. The residents of the village were also working to establish the community as an incorporated village.  Several names were suggested and votes taken. In a spirit of unity the Farmer Review encouraged the members of the village to unite behind the name Interlaken. On March 2, 1904, the Village was incorporated, and the following Saturday the Interlaken Review replaced the Farmer Review.

The look of Main Street changed over the years with major fires in December 1880 when much of the south end of business Main Street burned; in February 1891 when the Gambee House burned, it would be replaced with the Goodman House; in April 1926 when the warehouse at the corner of Orchard and Main burned and when the Robinson Hotel burned in February 1939.

Many businesses remain in and near the Village, continuing the tradition of serving the needs of the community and surrounding area.

Geography

Interlaken is at the junction of New York State Route 96, New York State Route 96A, and County Road 141.

Interlaken is in the Finger Lakes District and is between, but not adjacent to, Seneca Lake and Cayuga Lake.

Demographics

As of the census of 2010, there were 602 people, 243 households, and 147 families residing in the village. The population density was 2,006.7 people per square mile (860.0/km2). The racial makeup of the village was 95.2% White, 1.7% Black or African American, 0.3% Native American, 1.5% Asian, 0.0% Pacific Islander, 0.0% from other races, and 1.3% from two or more races. Hispanic or Latino of any race were 0.7% of the population.

There were 243 households, out of which 30.5% had children under the age of 18 living with them, 44.9% were married couples living together, 11.5% had a female householder with no husband present, and 39.5% were non-families. 32.9% of all households were made up of individuals, and 14.4% had someone living alone who was 65 years of age or older. The average household size was 2.36 and the average family size was 3.01.

In the village, the population was spread out, with 25.0% under the age of 20, 8.0% from 20 to 24, 23.6% from 25 to 44, 27.0% from 45 to 64, and 16.5% who were 65 years of age or older. The median age was 38.1 years. For every 100 females, there were 99.3 males. For every 100 females age 18 and over, there were 95.0 males.

The median income for a household in the village was $44,688, and the median income for a family was $71,875. Males had a median income of $45,208 versus $37,000 for females. The per capita income for the village was $23,402. About 14.5% of families and 20.1% of the population were below the poverty line, including 26.5% of those under age 18 and 15.5% of those age 65 or over.

Housing
There were 289 housing units at an average density of 963.3 per square mile (412.9/km2). 15.9% of housing units were vacant.

There were 243 occupied housing units in the village. 165 were owner-occupied units (67.9%), while 78 were renter-occupied (32.1%). The homeowner vacancy rate was 4.0% of total units. The rental unit vacancy rate was 11.4%.

Notable people
 Theodore D. Day, farmer and politician who served in the New York Assembly from 1961 to 1965 and Senate from 1966 to 1972
 Rod Serling, screenwriter, playwright, television producer, and narrator best known as the creator of The Twilight Zone

References

External links
Village of Interlaken (official website)

Villages in New York (state)
Populated places established in 1904
Villages in Seneca County, New York
1904 establishments in New York (state)